Wim Opbrouck (born 5 February 1969) is a Flemish actor and singer.  He is especially known for his work on stage.

Opbrouck comes from Bavikhove, part of Harelbeke and studied at the Herman Teirlinck Studio. As an actor, he joined the Blue Monday Company. In 1997 he performed in a 12-hour theater marathon production of Ten oorlog by Tom Lanoye. Following the merger of this company with KNS (Antwerp), he became an actor at the Drama House. He took on large roles in Aars!, Leenane Trilogy, L. King of Pain, and Macbeth. In 2005 he transferred to the new NTGent.

He gained fame through his appearance in the travel documentary , a collaboration with composer and producer  and photographer , in which he travels through Europe on a motorcycle. He's also well known for appearing in the television shows  and In De Gloria. He played in the films like Manneken Pis, Meisje and Everybody's Famous!

In addition, he also plays the occasional group The Dolfijntjes. He sings and plays accordion.

In 2008 it was reported that in 2010 he would succeed John Simons as artistic director of NTGent.

Selected filmography
Ad Fundum (1993) – Jean-Luc
Manneken Pis (1995) – Desire
 (2000) – Frank Verbert
Everybody's Famous! (2000) – Rik De Visser
Zoltan (2001) – Trainer
A Perfect Match (2007) – Julien
Frits and Freddy (2010) – Carlo Mus
 – Mayor
Salamander (2013)
Cobain (2018)
All of Us (2019)
Annette (2021)

External links

 De Dolfijntjes

1969 births
Living people
Belgian male actors
People from Harelbeke